Joachim Herrmann may refer to:

 Joachim Herrmann (archaeologist), (1932–2010), East German archaeologist and academic
 Joachim Herrmann (CSU), (born 1956), German politician
 Joachim Herrmann (politician, born 1928)